This is a list of flag bearers who have represented Nauru at the Olympics.

Flag bearers carry the national flag of their country at the opening ceremony of the Olympic Games.

See also
Nauru at the Olympics

References

Flagbearers
Nauru
Olympic flagbearers